Ambient is a MUI-based desktop environment for MorphOS. Its development was started in 2001 by David Gerber. Its main goals were that it should be fully asynchronous, simple and fast. Ambient remotely resembles Workbench and Directory Opus Magellan trying to mix the best of both worlds.

Features

Ambient does not strictly follow the Amiga Workbench interface paradigm but there are still many similarities: while programs are called tools, program attributes are called tooltypes, data files are projects and directories are drawers.

 support for ARexx scripting language
 default icon library for hundreds of fileformats
 fully asynchronous, multi-threaded design
 fast asynchronous file I/O functions and file notifications
 support for PNG and other Amiga icon formats
 built-in icon, workbench and wbstart libraries
 built-in applications like disk formatting and commodities manager
 panels which are used as program launchers

Ambient is localized for various languages and while it is part of MorphOS, it is also available separately. There are various visual effects in Ambient which are taking an advantage of hardware accelerated visual effects in MorphOS.

Desktop icons
The native icon format in Ambient is a PNG icon but there is built-in support for other Amiga icon formats. Ambient introduced special icon format called DataType Icons where the icon is simply any image file renamed to include .info extension. Those icons are read using Amiga DataType system.

Development status
In 2005, David Gerber released Ambient source code under GPL and it is now developed by the Ambient development team.

See also 

 Amiga Workbench
 MorphOS
 Scalos

References

External links 
 
 
 CVS snapshots

Amiga software
Free desktop environments
Free software programmed in C
MorphOS